Actinopeltis  may refer to:
 Actinopeltis (fungus), a genus of fungi in the family Microthyriaceae
 Actinopeltis (trilobite), an extinct genus of trilobites in the family Cheiruridae